Sovereignty of God in Christianity can be defined primarily as the right of God to exercise his ruling power over his creation, and secondarily, but not necessarily, as the exercise of this right. The way God exercises his ruling power is subject to divergences notably related to the concept of God's self-imposed limitations. The relationship between free will and the sovereignty of God has been relevant notably in the Calvinist-Arminian debate and in the philosophical theodicy.

Theological definition 
The Beacon Dictionary of Theology defines God's sovereignty as a twofold concept: "First, it may be seen as the divine right to rule totally; second, it may be extended to include God's exercise of this right. As to the first aspect, there is no debate. Difference of opinion arises in re­spect to the second aspect."

The Easton's Bible Dictionary defines God's sovereignty as His "absolute right to do all things according to his own good pleasure."

The Holman Bible Dictionary defines God's sovereignty as the teaching "[...] that all things come from and depend upon God. [...] [It] does not mean[s] that everything which occurs in the world is God's will."

According to these definitions, it comes that God's sovereignty in Christianity can be defined primarily as the right of God to exercise his ruling power over his creation, and secondarily, but not necessarily, as the exercise of this right. The way God exercises his ruling power is subject to divergence of opinion.

Here are some views on God's sovereignty expressed in confessions of faith or catechisms which illustrate the divergence of opinion among Christian denominations:

The Catechism of the Catholic Church position is that: "God is the sovereign master of his plan. But to carry it out he also makes use of his creatures' co-operation. This use is not a sign of weakness, but rather a token of almighty God's greatness and goodness. For God grants his creatures not only their existence, but also the dignity of acting on their own, of being causes and principles for each other, [...]".

The Reformed position is described in the Westminster Confession of Faith, which states, "God, from all eternity, did, by the most wise and holy counsel of His own will, freely, and unchangeably ordain whatever comes to pass."

Sovereignty and free will

The debate in Christianity
Bible scholar Charles Ryrie expressed the idea of the existence of God's self-imposed limitations. Especially, the question whether God's sovereignty is consistent with meaningful human decisions which are free from compulsion is a significant theological question in Christianity. The debate on this question was first clearly expressed by Augustine in the 4th century. The debate has continued through various forms notably through the Calvinist-Arminian debate until today. A Calvinist approach to this debate is expressed by Charles Ryrie by these words: "Ultimately God is in complete control of all things, though He may choose to let certain events happen according to natural laws which He has ordained." A non-Calvinist, classical theist approach to the debate is expressed by Bible scholar William Leonard by the following: "God has created a world in which freedom is a real possibility. His permissive will provides for human freedom and the laws of nature."

Calvinist view
Calvinism argues that God cannot provide humanity with free will; to do so is to compromise the sovereignty of God, at least in the exercise of faith or salvation. “We say that he [man] is free, but his freedom is within limits, and those limits are defined by the sovereignty of God.” “Only God has free will in the sense of ultimate self-determination.” The sovereignty of God was "Calvin’s most central doctrine. It means that nothing is left to chance or human free will." "The heart of Calvinism is not the doctrine of predestination, or, for that matter, any one of the other Five Points of Calvinism. The central truth proclaimed by Calvinism, Calvinism that is faithful to its heritage, is the absolute sovereignty of God."

Calvin expressly taught that it is God's sovereign decision to determine whether an individual is saved or damned. He writes "By predestination we mean the eternal decree of God, by which he determined with himself whatever he wished to happen with regard to every man. All are not created on equal terms, but some are preordained to eternal life, others to eternal damnation; and, accordingly, as each has been created for one or other of these ends, we say that he has been predestinated to life or to death."

R.C. Sproul, an influential Calvinist, expresses God's sovereignty over salvation as follows: "If God has decided our destinies from all eternity, that strongly suggests that our free choices are but charades, empty exercises in predetermined playacting. It is as though God wrote the script for us in concrete and we are merely carrying out his scenario." Similarly, Swiss reformer Huldrych Zwingli concludes that God is the "author, mover and instigator" of human sin.

Arminian view
The majority Arminian view accepts classical theism, which states that God is omnipresent, omnipotent, and omniscient. In that view, God's power, knowledge, and presence have no external limitations, that is, outside of his divine nature and character.

Besides, Arminianism view on God's sovereignty is based on postulates stemming from God's character, especially as fully revealed in Jesus Christ. On the first hand, divine election must be defined in such a way that God is not in any case, and even in a secondary way, the author of evil. On the other hand, man's responsibility for evil must be absolutely preserved. It would not correspond to the character of God. Those two postulates require a specific way by which God chooses to manifest his sovereignty when interacting with his creatures:

 It requires, for God to operates according to a limited mode of providence. This means that God purposely exercises his sovereignty in ways that do not illustrate the full extent of his omnipotence.
 It requires for God's election to be a "predestination by foreknowledge".

In that respect, God's foreknowledge reconciles with human free will in the following way: Human free will is limited by original sin, though God's prevenient grace restores to humanity the ability to accept God's call of salvation. God's foreknowledge of the future is exhaustive and complete, and therefore the future is certain and not contingent on human action. God does not determine the future, but He does know it. God's certainty and human contingency are compatible.

Arminianism teaches that God takes initiative in the salvation process and his grace comes to all people. However, his prevenient grace is resistible: Picirilli states that "indeed this grace is so close to regeneration that it inevitably leads to regeneration unless finally resisted."

To Arminians, then, the decision to believe and repent is a decision which a sovereign God granted to humanity. Thus, free will is granted and limited by God's sovereignty, but God's sovereignty allows all men the choice to accept the Gospel of Jesus through faith, simultaneously allowing all men to resist.

Sovereignty and theodicy 
The relationship between free will and the sovereignty of God is relevant in the philosophical theodicy. As stated by Alvin Plantinga, theodicy is the "answer to the question of why God permits evil". Plantinga argues that human free will explains the existence of evil without threatening the existence of an omnipotent and omnibenevolent God. Plantinga's argument is consistent with Augustinian theology which teaches that “The entry of evil into the world is generally explained as punishment for sin and its continued presence due to humans' misuse of free will. God's goodness and benevolence, according to the Augustinian theodicy, remain perfect and without responsibility for evil or suffering.” Plantinga relies on the free will of humanity to take ultimate responsibility for evil rather than attributing all actions of all creatures, whether, good or evil, to God. The sin of Satan, the sin of Adam and the sin of David each represent a permissible consequence of God's sovereign decision to create humanity with free will, rather than the directive of a sovereign God for which the sovereign God is sovereignly and directly responsible. When Adam chose to disobey God, God did not excuse Adam, claiming that God was the source of the disobedience. Rather God held Adam responsible for Adam’s exercise of his will.

Sovereignty and prayer

Calvinist view 
Author A.W. Pink argued that prayer does not alter the course of events. "Prayer is not the requesting of God to alter His purpose or for Him to form a new one." In this text Pink also argues that God did not love sinners and had deliberately created "unto damnation" those who would not accept Christ. According to this view, praying for the salvation of those God actively and deliberately chose for damnation will not change their destiny. This conclusion logically flows from the premise, if it is true, that God's sovereignty necessitates that God, rather than humans, determine salvation. Indeed, Pink directly states that "He [God] ordained that they should be damned. This view is sometimes referred to as "double predestination", which John Calvin embraced, believing that God has actively chosen some people for damnation. "Those therefore whom God passes by [does not elect] He reprobates, and that for no other cause than He is pleased to exclude them."

Contrary to the view embraced by John Calvin and A.W. Pink, another view is that prayer includes petitions to God for favor and supplication, expecting that God will hear and grant the petitions presented through prayer. Such prayers include petitions for salvation. As Charles Spurgeon stated: “If sinners be damned, at least let them leap to Hell over our dead bodies. And if they perish, let them perish with our arms wrapped about their knees, imploring them to stay. If Hell must be filled, let it be filled in the teeth of our exertions, and let not one go unwarned and unprayed for.”

Notes and references

Citations

Sources
 
 
 
 
 
 
 
 
 
 
 

Sovereignty
Christian